Piz Radun (also known as Plangghorn) is a mountain of the Swiss Lepontine Alps, overlooking Safien in the canton of Graubünden.

References

External links
 Piz Radun on Hikr

Mountains of Graubünden
Mountains of the Alps
Lepontine Alps
Mountains of Switzerland
Safiental